Zisaji Presidency College, is a general degree college in Kiphire, Nagaland. It offers undergraduate courses in arts and is affiliated to Nagaland University. This college was established in 1997.

Departments

Arts
English 
History 
Political Science 
Geography
Economics
Education
Environmental Studies

Accreditation
The college is recognized by the University Grants Commission (UGC).

References

External links
https://zisaji.org.in/

Colleges affiliated to Nagaland University
Universities and colleges in Nagaland
Educational institutions established in 1997
1997 establishments in Nagaland